The Journal of Physical Chemistry Letters is a peer-reviewed scientific journal published by the American Chemical Society. The editor-in-chief is Gregory D. Scholes at Princeton University. The Journal of Physical Chemistry Letters covers research on all aspects of physical chemistry. George C. Schatz was editor-in-chief from 2010 to 2019.

Scope 
The Journal of Physical Chemistry Letters publishes letters, perspectives on emerging topics, editorials and viewpoints. Specific materials of interest will include, but are not limited to:
 Physical Insights into Quantum Phenomena and Function
 Physical Insights into Materials and Molecular Properties
 Physical Insights into Light Interacting with Matter
 Physical Insights into the Biosphere, Atmosphere, and Space
 Physical Insights into Chemistry, Catalysis, and Interfaces
 Physical Insights into Energy Science

Abstracting, indexing, and impact factor 
According to the Journal Citation Reports, the journal had an impact factor of 6.88 for 2021.

It is indexed in the following bibliographic databases:
 Cambridge Structural Database (Cambridge Crystallographic Data Centre)
 Chemical Abstracts Service/SciFinder (ACS)
 ChemWeb (ChemIndustry.com)
 Chimica Database (Elsevier)
 Current Contents: Physical, Chemical & Earth Sciences (Thomson Reuters)
 INSPEC (IET)
 Journal Citation Reports/Science Edition (Thomson Reuters)
 Nature Index (Springer Nature)
 PASCAL Database (INIST/CNRS)
 Science Citation Index (Thomson Reuters)
 Science Citation Index Expanded (Thomson Reuters)
 SCOPUS (Elsevier)
 VINITI (All-Russian Institute of Science & Technological Information)
 Web of Science (Thomson Reuters)

See also 
 The Journal of Physical Chemistry A
 The Journal of Physical Chemistry B
 The Journal of Physical Chemistry C

References

External links 
 

American Chemical Society academic journals
Biweekly journals
Physical chemistry journals
Publications established in 2010
English-language journals